Dendropsophus kubricki is a frog in the family Hylidae.  It is endemic to Peru.  Scientists have seen it between 106 and 725 meters above sea level.

References

Amphibians described in 2018
Frogs of South America
Endemic fauna of Peru
Amphibians of Peru
kubricki